Bayt Marran  is a sub-district located in Arhab District, Sana'a Governorate, Yemen. Bayt Marran  had a population of 3161 according to the 2004 census.

References 

Sub-districts in Arhab District